Yuri II, also known as George II of Vladimir or Georgy II Vsevolodovich (26 November 11884 March 1238), was the fourth Grand Prince of Vladimir (1212–1216, 1218–1238) who presided over Vladimir-Suzdal at the time of the Mongol invasion of Rus'.

He was the third and best-loved son of Vsevolod III and Maria Shvarnovna.

He first distinguished himself in the battles against Ryazan in 1208. His father wanted Yuri to inherit Rostov and his elder brother Konstantin to succeed him in Vladimir. The latter, however, declared that he would rule both towns or nothing at all. Thereupon Vsevolod disinherited Konstantin and passed the throne to Yuri.

After Vsevolod's death, Konstantin allied himself with Mstislav the Bold and defeated Yuri and his other brothers on the Lipitsa River. Having gained Vladimir, Konstantin sent Yuri to rule Rostov and Yaroslavl. Two years later Konstantin died, and Yuri was allowed to return to Vladimir.

During his reign in Vladimir, Yuri waged several wars against Volga Bulgaria and founded the fortress of Nizhny Novgorod on the Volga River to secure the area from Bulgarian attacks. He installed his younger brother Yaroslav in Novgorod. When the Mongols first approached Russia in 1223, he sent a small unit against them, but it arrived too late to take part in the disastrous Battle of the Kalka River.

When the Mongols returned in 1237, Yuri treated their envoys with disdain. Likewise, he did not help Ryazan when Batu Khan laid siege to that city. His own capital, however, was the next in line. Yuri's sons were soundly defeated near Kolomna, and Yuri himself could barely escape to Yaroslavl. His wife Agatha (Mikhail of Kiev's sister) and all his family died in Vladimir when a church where they had sought refuge from the fire collapsed.

Yuri himself was killed on 4 March 1238, in the Battle of the Sit River, whereby vast Mongol hordes defeated the army of Vladimir-Suzdal. The relics of the prince are in Dormition Cathedral, Vladimir.

See also
Mongol invasion of Russia
Kitezh

Further reading

 Memorsky Alexander. (1889) The founder of Nizhny Novgorod, Grand Duke Georgy (Yury) II Vsevolodovich (Основатель Нижнего Новгорода Великий князь Георгий (Юрий) II Всеволодович) at Runivers.ru in DjVu and PDF formats

1188 births
1238 deaths
People from Suzdal
Grand Princes of Vladimir
Rurik dynasty
History of Nizhny Novgorod
Russian military personnel killed in action
Russian folklore
13th-century princes in Kievan Rus'
Eastern Orthodox monarchs
Russian saints